Avery is traditionally a male given name which was originally an Old English surname that was itself derived from an Old French pronunciation of the name Alfred or the Ancient Germanic name Alberich. The name is derived from the Old English words aelf, meaning elf, and ric, meaning power/mighty/king/ruler and dates back to the 16th century.

Regional variations

Europe 
Avery is originally a boys' name in England, France and Germany and dates back to the 16th century when it was modified from Alfred. The feminine form is rare in European countries but where found is usually used with the feminine alternative spelling Averie/Averi.

America 
In 1989 Americans started using the name for girls and it is sometimes used with the feminine alternative spelling Averie/Averi. The name is now more popular for girls in the US and Canada.

Notable men with the given name

Avery Caesar Alexander (1910–1999), American civil rights leader and Louisiana politician
Avery Anderson (born 1997), American politician
Avery Anderson III (born 2000), American basketball player
Avery August (born 1964), American scientist, vice provost at Cornell University
Avery Aylsworth (born 1996), American volleyball player
Avery Blake, American college lacrosse player and coach
Avery Bradley (born 1990), American professional basketball player
Avery Brooks (born 1948), American actor, director, singer, and educator best known for his role as Benjamin Sisko in Star Trek: Deep Space Nine
Avery Brundage (1887–1975), American sports administrator, President of the International Olympic Committee, 1952–1972
Alfred Avery Burnham (1819–1879), U.S. Representative from Connecticut
Avery Cardoza, American author, professional gambler and publisher
Avery Claflin (1898–1979), American composer who studied law and business and pursued a career in banking
Avery Clayton (1947–2009), American nonprofit executive, established a library and museum to house African American artefacts
Avery Corman (born 1935), American novelist
Elisha Avery Crary (1905–1978), United States District Judge of the United States District Court
Avery Craven (1885–1980), American historian who wrote about the nineteenth-century United States
Avery Dulles, S.J. (1918–2008), American Jesuit priest, theologian, and Cardinal of the Catholic Church
Avery E. Field (1883–1955), photographer in Riverside, California
Avery Fisher (1906–1994), American businessman, founder of Fisher Electronics
Avery Garrett (1916–1988), American politician in the state of Washington
Avery Gilbert, American geneticist, self-described "smell scientist" and "sensory psychologist"
Avery Hopwood (1882–1928), American playwright of the Jazz Age
Richard Avery Hornsby, English military figure from the 18th century
Alan Avery Allen Horsley, British Anglican priest and author in the 20th century
 Frank Avery Hutchins (1851–1914), American educator and librarian
 Avery "Kid" Howard (1908–1966), American jazz trumpeter associated with the New Orleans jazz scene
Avery Jenkins (born 1978), American professional disc golfer
Avery John CM (born 1975), Trinidadian soccer player
Avery Johnson (born 1965), American basketball coach
Frederick Avery Johnson (1833–1893), American politician and banker
Francis Avery Jones (1910–1998), Welsh physician and gastroenterologist
Isaiah Avery Jones (born 1995), American football wide receiver
Avery Kay, United States Air Force colonel, designer of the A-10 Warthog
Avery Kier (1905–1987), United States Marine Corps aviator and general officer
G. Avery Lee (1916–2008), Southern Baptist and American Baptist preacher
Max Avery Lichtenstein, American record producer, composer and songwriter
Avery Lipman, American music industry executive
John Avery Lomax (1867–1948), American teacher, a pioneering musicologist and folklorist
Elias Avery Lowe (1879–1969), Lithuanian–American palaeographer
C. Avery Mason (1904–1970), bishop of the Episcopal Diocese of Dallas
Gerald Avery Mays (1939–1994), American football player and defensive lineman
Edward Avery McIlhenny (1872–1949), American businessman, explorer, bird bander and conservationist
John Avery McIlhenny (1867–1942), American businessman, soldier, politician and public servant
Avery Bryan Morris (born 1987), American professional baseball pitcher
Avery Moss (born 1994), American football outside linebacker
Avery Ng (born 1976), Hong Kong politician and social activist
Avery Paraiso (born 1994), Filipino-Irish commercial model and actor
Avery Parrish (1917–1959), American jazz pianist, composer and arranger
Avery Patterson, American football safety
Harry Avery Reid (1877–1947), British veterinarian, bacteriologist and pathologist
Avery Robinson (1878–1965), American classical composer
Avery Rockefeller (1903–1986), American investment banker and conservationist
Percy Avery Rockefeller (1878–1934), American board director, founder of Owenoke Corporation
William Avery Rockefeller (1810–1906), American businessman, lumberman and salesman
Michael Avery Ross (born 1961), American businessman and politician
Avery Saltzman, Canadian actor and theater director
Avery Scharer (born 1986), Filipino-American professional basketball player
Avery Schreiber (1935–2002), American comedian and actor
Avery W. Severance (1819–1874), American farmer and politician from New York
Avery Sharpe (born 1954), American jazz double-bassist
Avery Judd Skilton (1802–1858), American physician and naturalist
Avery Skinner (1796–1876), American politician from New York
Avery Stafford (born 1965), gospel and R&B vocalist from the United States
Avery Storm (born 1981), American R&B singer
Earl Avery Thompson (1891–1967), American engineer and inventor
Avery Trufelman, American podcaster and radio producer 
Avery C. Upchurch (1928–1994), American politician
Avery Warley (born 1987), American professional basketball player
Avery Williams (disambiguation), multiple people
Avery Williamson (born 1992), American football linebacker
Avery Wilson (born 1995), American singer-songwriter and dancer
Avery Young (born 1992), American football player

Fictional male characters
Avery, a Death Eater from the Harry Potter series
Avery Brown, Murphy Brown's son; also Murphy's deceased mother, on the sitcom Murphy Brown
Avery Bullock, in the TV show American Dad!, voiced by Patrick Stewart
Avery Silas Barkley, a character in  the ABC prime time drama Nashville
Avery Carrington, a real estate tycoon in the video game Grand Theft Auto: Vice City
Avery Connor, a central character in Yoshitaka Amano and Greg Rucka's graphic novel Wolverine & Elektra: The Redeemer
Avery Johnson, a character from the Halo series
Avery Arable, Fern's brother in the book Charlotte's Web by E. B. White
Avery Dixon, a central character in the Stephen King novel The Institute
Avery Tolar, a character from 1993 film The Firm
Fitzroy Avery Vacker, a character from Shannon Messenger's Keeper of the Lost Cities book series

Notable women with the given name 
Avery Bourne, Republican member, Illinois House of Representatives
Avery Jae Clemens, American model, transgender activist, social media influencer, and writer
Nicole Avery Cox, American actress and comedy writer
Avery Haines, Canadian television journalist
Avery Yale Kamila, American journalist and community organizer
Avery Singer, American artist known for creating digitally assisted paintings
Avery Skinner, American volleyball player
Avery Grace Carei professional dancer, activist, regular Baddie

Fictional female characters
Avery Bailey Clark, from the American CBS Daytime soap opera The Young and the Restless
Avery Jennings, in the TV comedy Dog with a Blog
Avery Jessup, the wife of Jack Donaghy in the sitcom 30 Rock
Avery Ryan, Ph.D., FBI Deputy Director in the drama series CSI
Laura Avery Sumner, from the CBS soap opera Knots Landing
Avery Kylie Grambs, from the book series The Inheritance Games

References

Masculine given names
English-language unisex given names